Bill Horton (September 5, 1946 - May 24, 1988) was a Canadian professional ice hockey defenceman.

He played 193 games in the World Hockey Association for the Cleveland Crusaders, Los Angeles Sharks, and Indianapolis Racers.

References

External links

1946 births
1988 deaths
Canadian ice hockey defencemen
Cleveland Crusaders players
Dayton Gems players
Flint Generals players
Greensboro Generals (SHL) players
Ice hockey people from Ontario
Indianapolis Racers players
London Nationals players
Los Angeles Sharks players
Mohawk Valley Comets players
North American Hockey League (1973–1977) coaches
Syracuse Hornets players
Utica Mohawks players
Sportspeople from Kawartha Lakes